Pieter Cornelisz Kunst (1484–1490, Leiden – 1560–1561, Leiden), was a Dutch Renaissance painter.

Biography
Kunst was one of the three sons of the painter Cornelis Engebrechtsz who became a painter and glass painter (engraver). His brothers Cornelis Cornelisz Kunst and Lucas Cornelisz de Kock were also painters. He is known for historical allegories, drawings, and glass painting. In 1509 he married Marijtgen Gerritsdr van Dam, with whom he had a son Adriaen Pietersz who became a glass engraver, and a daughter Marijtgen.

References
  Life of Cornelis Engebrechtsz. in Karel van Mander's Schilder-boeck, 1604, courtesy of the Digital library for Dutch literature
 J.D. Bangs, Cornelis Engebrechtsz.'s Leiden, studies in cultural history, Assen 1979.

Pieter Cornelisz Kunst on Artnet
Pieter Cornelisz Kunst on RKD site

1484 births
1561 deaths
Dutch Renaissance painters
Artists from Leiden